Federico Silvestre (born October 6, 1987 in Carrilobo) is an Argentine football midfielder. Currently playing for Puerto Cabello.

External links
 
 

1987 births
Living people
Argentine footballers
Argentine expatriate footballers
Instituto footballers
General Paz Juniors footballers
Universitario de Sucre footballers
Association football midfielders
Academia Puerto Cabello players